The 4th constituency of Val-d'Oise is a French legislative constituency in the Val-d'Oise département.
It is currently represented by Naïma Moutchou of Horizons.

Description

The 4th constituency of Val-d'Oise is composed of the areas north of Argenteuil in the centre of the department. The seat almost entirely urban as it is composed of towns that form parts of the northern suburbs of Paris.

Historically the seat has been consistent in supporting conservative candidates but this changed in 2012 as the seat was won by Gérard Sebaoun of the PS.

Historic Representation

Election results

2022

 
 
 
 
 
 
 
|-
| colspan="8" bgcolor="#E9E9E9"|
|-

2017

2012

 
 
 
 
 
|-
| colspan="8" bgcolor="#E9E9E9"|
|-

2007

 
 
 
 
 
 
 
 
|-
| colspan="8" bgcolor="#E9E9E9"|
|-

2002

 
 
 
 
|-
| colspan="8" bgcolor="#E9E9E9"|
|-

1997

 
 
 
 
 
 
 
 
 
|-
| colspan="8" bgcolor="#E9E9E9"|
|-

Sources
Official results of French elections from 2002: "Résultats électoraux officiels en France" (in French).

4